The General of the Dead Army may refer to:

 The General of the Dead Army (novel), a 1963 novel by Ismail Kadare
 The General of the Dead Army (film), a 1983 film directed by Luciano Tovoli